Vatera is an 8-kilometer  long sandy beach in the southern part of Lesbos island. The name (Βατερά) comes from βάτα (vata, meaning "bramble"), in reference to prickly bushes that blocked the old mule-drive access.

It is 55 km in total from Mytilini. The 7 km long, sandy beach here, backed by vegetated hills and looking out to Hios and Psara, offers some of the warmest, cleanest swimming on Lesvos. Several family hotels and taverns with traditional tastes are across the biggest beach on the island.

3 km west you can gaze out to the cape of Agios Fokas, where foundations and columns stubs remain of the temple of Dionysos and an early Christian basilica.

The Vatera area hit the Greek news in 1997 when a palaeontologist, Michael Dermitzakis, confirmed what farmers unearthing bones had long suspected when he announced that the area was a treasure trove of two-million-year-old fossils, belonging to the Late Pliocene. The fossils include bones of stenoid horses (Equus stenonis), mastodons, a baboon-like monkey (Paradolichopithecus) and a giant tortoise (Cheirogaster), the latter the size of a small car.

Around two million years ago, Lesvos was not an island but was joined to the Asian mainland, and the gulf of Vatera was a subtropical shallow sea. The environment of Vatera at that time, was partly forested, partly open woodlands, with meandering rivers through the area flowing to the sea. The animals in question died somewhere near the rivers and their carcasses were transported by the water downstream. They got stuck somewhere at a bend, and sediments covered the remains until they were removed by Dermitzakis' team. In the nearby village of Vrissa, the University of Athens has established a natural history collection dedicated to the palaeontological finds.

See also
List of settlements in Lesbos

References 
Athanassiou A. 2002. A new gazelle species (Artiodactyla, Bovidae) from the Late Pliocene of Greece. Annales Géologiques des Pays Helléniques 1e Série 39, A: 299-310.

Dermitzakis MD, Eisenmann V, Galoukas SF. 1991. The presence of Pleistocene Mammals in Lesvos Island (E. Aegean). Bulletin of the Geological Society of Greece XXV (2), 405-421.

De Vos J, Van der Made J., Athanassiou A, Lyras G, Sondaar PY, Dermitzakis MD. 2002. Preliminary note on the Late Pliocene Fauna from Vatera (Lesvos, Greece). Annales Géologiques des Pays Helléniques 1e Série 39, A: 37-70.

External links
Detailed description of Vatera
All information for Vatera

http://sites.google.com/site/syllogosvrissas

Landforms of the North Aegean
Populated places in Lesbos